Al Ain International Airport ; ; transliterated: Maṭār Al-ʿAyn Ad-Duwalī) is an airport located  west or northwest of Al Ain in the Eastern Region of the Emirate of Abu Dhabi, the United Arab Emirates. It was opened on 31 March 1994. It is the fifth busiest airport in the UAE.

Airlines and destinations

Accidents and incidents
 On 27 February 2011, a Grumman 21T eight seater aircraft crashed shortly after takeoff, killing four on board.

See also
 Buraimi Airport

References

Airport
Airports in the United Arab Emirates
1994 establishments in the United Arab Emirates